The 2017 USL season was the seventh season of the United Soccer League. The league was granted provisional Division II status by the USSF.  It is organized by the United Soccer League.

New York Red Bulls II are the defending champions of both the USL Cup and Regular Season.

Changes from 2016
Expansion
Reno 1868 FC

Joined from NASL
Ottawa Fury FC
Tampa Bay Rowdies

Rebrand
Arizona United SC to Phoenix Rising FC

Folded
FC Montreal

Rule changes
Teams are now permitted only three substitutions a match. Previously, teams were allowed five substitutions a match.

Teams

† Capacity for venue is 25,500; Team moved from Melbourne, Florida to Orlando in April 2017 to allow direct player transfers with MLS parent club Orlando City SC.

Other venues
 The Charlotte Independence played its first few home games at Eagle Field on the campus of Winthrop University in Rock Hill, South Carolina as the Sportsplex at Matthews was being built.

Competition format
The season started on March 25 and ended October 15. The top eight finishers in each conference qualified for the playoffs.

Managerial changes

League table
Eastern Conference 

Western Conference

Results table

Playoffs

Eastern Conference

Western Conference

USL Championship

Championship Game MVP: Paolo DelPiccolo (LOU)

Attendance

Average home attendances
Ranked from highest to lowest average attendance.

Updated to games of October 15, 2017
Sources: USL

Statistical leaders

Top scorers 

Source:

Top assists 

Source:

|}

Shutouts

Source:

Hat-tricks

League awards

Individual awards 
 Most Valuable Player: Dane Kelly (RNO) 
 Rookie of the Year: Chris Wehan (RNO) 
 Defender of the Year: Sebastien Ibeagha (SAN) 
 Goalkeeper of the Year: Diego Restrepo (SAN) 
 Coach of the Year: Mark Briggs (SLC)

All-League Teams 
First Team

F: Chandler Hoffman (SLC), Dane Kelly (RNO), Enzo Martinez (CLT)
M: Marcel Schäfer (TBR), Sebastian Velasquez (SLC),  Chris Wehan (RNO)
D: Paco Craig (LOU), Harrison Delbridge (CIN),  Sebastien Ibeagha (SAN), Forrest Lasso (CHS)
G: Diego Restrepo (SAN)

Second Team

F: Juan Pablo Caffa (TUL), Corey Hertzog (PIT), Romario Williams (CHS)
M: Vincent Bezecourt (NYRB), Billy Forbes (SAN), Justin Portillo (CHS)
D: Ryan Felix (ROC), James Kiffe (SAC),  Taylor Mueller (CHS), Jimmy Ockford (RNO)
G: Earl Edwards Jr. (ORL)

References

	

 
USL Championship seasons
2017 in American soccer leagues